This article lists the chairmen of the Senate of Turkey, which existed as an upper house of the Turkish parliament between 1961 and 1980.

List of chairmen

See also
Grand National Assembly of Turkey
Speaker of the Grand National Assembly
Senate of the Republic

References
Turkish ministries, etc – Rulers.org

Politics of Turkey
Turkey, Senate
Senate, Chairmen
Senate of the Republic (Turkey)